The Moruya Times and South Coast Journal was an English language newspaper published in Moruya, New South Wales, Australia from 1886 to 1915. At various times the paper was known as The Moruya Times and South Coast Journal, Tilba Times and South Dampier miner, and The Moruya-Tilba Times. A rival newspaper The Moruya Examiner has run continuously under various titles since 1863.

History
The Moruya Times and South Coast Journal was first published in March 1886 every Wednesday by Walter Bennett and later by William Boot.   The newspaper has changed names several times:

Digitisation
The paper has been digitised as part of the Australian Newspapers Digitisation Program project of the National Library of Australia.

See also
 List of newspapers in Australia
 List of newspapers in New South Wales

References

External links
 

Defunct newspapers published in New South Wales
Newspapers on Trove